The Tiger Street Food Festival is a food ceremony in Nigeria. The festival was created to promote the street food experience, and is sponsored by Tiger Beer, a product of Nigerian brewer Nigerian Breweries Plc.

History 
The Tiger Street Food Festival was first celebrated in December 2020 at Federal Capital Territory, Abuja. The festival is largely sponsored by Tiger Beer, whose production in Nigeria is managed by Nigerian Breweries Plc.

The 2021 Tiger Street Food Festival's first edition was held in April at Cubana lounge, New Owerri, Imo state and was attended by several Nigerian musicians like Bella Shmurda, Xbusta, among others. The second edition of the Tiger Street Food Festival took place in July 2021 and was held at IBB Square, Markudi, Benue State. The festival was attended by many popular Nigerian celebrities like Peruzzi, DJ Big N, DJ Tony, MC Smart, and Rapizo.

Festivity

Food 
The Tiger Street Food Festival features arrays of food prepared by various vendors such as Zhie’s cuisine, Annie’s Kitchen Events, Kitchen Chronicles, and Maozy Foods. Mobile restaurants, or food trucks, are present during the festival.

Art 
The festival has become a platform where tiger-inspired murals and street art such as graffiti art are showcased. Urban graffiti and neon paintings are usually displayed.

References 

Food and drink festivals in Africa
Annual events in Nigeria